The fourth Inter-Cities Fairs Cup was played over the 1961–62 season. There were five representative teams for some major European cities, three of which lost out in the first round. The final was the first European final to be contested between two clubs from the same country, namely Spain. Valencia beat Barcelona 7–3 over two legs, and also reached the next two finals in the competition.

First round

|}

1Internazionale progressed to the Second round after winning a play-off match 5–3.

First leg

Second leg

Valencia won 7–1 on aggregate.

Hearts won 5–1 on aggregate.

Internazionale 4–4 Köln on aggregate.

Internazionale won 5–3 in play-off.

Novi Sad XI won 2–0 on aggregate.

MTK won 13–3 on aggregate.

Leipzig XI won 6–3 on aggregate.

Espanyol won 3–0 on aggregate.

Red Star won 5–2 on aggregate.

Hibernian won 6–4 on aggregate.

Sheffield Wednesday won 7–6 on aggregate.

Barcelona won 3–1 on aggregate.

Dinamo Zagreb won 9–4 on aggregate.

Second round

|}

1 MTK progressed to the quarter-finals after winning a play-off match 2–0.

First leg

Second leg

Valencia won 4–3 on aggregate.

Internazionale won 5–0 on aggregate.

Novi Sad XI won 10–3 on aggregate.

Leipzig XI 3–3 MTK on aggregate.

MTK won 2–0 in play-off.

Espanyol won 5–3 on aggregate.

Red Star won 5–0 on aggregate.

Sheffield Wednesday won 4–1 on aggregate.

Barcelona won 7–3 on aggregate.

Quarter-finals

|}

First leg

Second leg

Internazionale goalkeeper Lorenzo Buffon complained of an injury at halftime and was replaced by Ottavio Bugatti, substitutions were not officially allowed at the time.
Valencia won 5–3 on aggregate.

First leg

Second leg

Barcelona won 4–3 on aggregate.
Barcelona advance to the Semi-Final

Semifinals

|}

Final

First leg

Second leg

References

External links
 Inter-Cities Fairs Cup results at Rec.Sport.Soccer Statistics Foundation
 Inter-Cities Fairs Cup Seasons 1961-62 – results, protocols
 website eurocups-uefa.ru Fairs' Cup Seasons 1961-62 – results, protocols
 website Football Archive 1961–62 Fairs' Cup

2
Inter-Cities Fairs Cup seasons